Ustyumovo (Üśtem) is a rural locality (a village) in Kamyshlytamaksky Selsoviet, Bakalinsky District, Bashkortostan, Russia. The population was 179 as of 2010. There are 3 streets.

Geography 
Ustyumovo is located 25 km south of Bakaly (the district's administrative centre) by road. Utarovo is the nearest rural locality.

References 

Rural localities in Bakalinsky District